A wagon fort, wagon fortress, or corral, often referred to as circling the wagons, is a temporary fortification made of wagons arranged into a rectangle, circle, or other shape and possibly joined with each other to produce an improvised military camp. It is also known as a laager (from Afrikaans), especially in historical African contexts, and a tabor (from Polish/Ukrainian/Russian) among the Cossacks.

Overview 

Ammianus Marcellinus, a Roman army officer and historian of the 4th century, describes a Roman army approaching "ad carraginem" as they approach a Gothic camp. Historians interpret this as a wagon-fort.
Notable historical examples include the Hussites, who called it vozová hradba ("wagon wall"), known under the German translation Wagenburg ("wagon fort/fortress"), tabors in the armies of the Polish–Lithuanian Commonwealth and Cossacks, and the laager of settlers in South Africa.

Similar, ad hoc, defensive formations used in the United States were called corrals.
These were traditionally used by 19th century American settlers travelling to the West in convoys of Conestoga wagons.

History

Chinese 
One of the earliest written claims of using conjoined mobile shields as fortification is described in the Chinese historical record Book of Han. During the 119 BC Battle of Mobei of the Han–Xiongnu War, the famous Han general Wei Qing led his army through a fatiguing expeditionary march across the Gobi desert only to find Yizhixie chanyu's main force waiting to encircle them on the other side.  Using armored heavy wagons known as "Wu Gang Wagon" in ring formations as temporary defensive fortifications, Wei Qing neutralised the Xiongnu's initial cavalry charges, forcing a stalemate and buying time for his troops to recover strength, before using the cover of a sandstorm to launch a counteroffensive which overran the nomads.

Czechs and Hussites 

In the 15th century, during the Hussite Wars, the Hussites developed tactics of using the tabors, called vozová hradba in Czech or Wagenburg by the Germans, as mobile fortifications. It was first used in Battle of Nekmíř. When the Hussite army faced a numerically superior opponent, the Bohemians usually formed a square of the armed wagons, joined them with iron chains, and defended the resulting fortification against charges of the enemy. Such a camp was easy to establish and practically invulnerable to enemy cavalry. The etymology of the word tabor may come from the Hussite fortress and modern day Czech town of Tábor, which itself is a name derived from biblical Jezreel mountain Tabor (in Hebrew תבור).

The crew of each wagon consisted of 18 to 21 soldiers: 4 to 8 crossbowmen, 2 handgunners, 6 to 8 soldiers equipped with pikes or flails, 2 shield carriers and 2 drivers. The wagons would normally form a square, and inside the square would usually be the cavalry. There were two principal stages of the battle using the wagon fort: defensive and counterattack. The defensive part would be a pounding of the enemy with artillery. The Hussite artillery was a primitive form of a howitzer, called in Czech a houfnice, from which the English word howitzer comes. Also, they called their guns the Czech word píšťala (hand cannon), meaning that they were shaped like a pipe or a fife, from which the English word pistol is possibly derived. When the enemy would come close to the wagon fort, crossbowmen and hand-gunners would come from inside the wagons and inflict more casualties on the enemy at close range. There would even be stones stored in a pouch inside the wagons for throwing whenever the soldiers were out of ammunition. After this huge barrage, the enemy would be demoralized. The armies of the anti-Hussite crusaders were usually heavily armored knights, and Hussite tactics were to disable the knight's horses so that the dismounted (and slow) knights would be easier targets for the ranged men. Once the commander saw it fit, the second stage of battle would begin. Men with swords, flails, and polearms would come out and attack the weary enemy. Together with the infantry, the cavalry in the square would come out and attack. At this point, the enemy would be eliminated or very nearly so.

The wagon fort was later used by the crusading anti-Hussite armies at the Battle of Tachov (1427). However, the anti-Hussite German forces, being inexperienced at this type of strategy, were defeated. The Hussite wagon fort would meet its demise at the Battle of Lipany (1434), where the Utraquist faction of Hussites defeated the Taborite faction by getting the Taborites inside a wagon fort on a hill to charge at them by at first attacking, then retreating. The Utraquists would reunite with the Catholic Church afterwards. Thus ended the wagon fort's effect on Czech history. The first victory against the wagon fort at the Battle of Tachov showed that the best ways to defeat it were to prevent it from being erected in the first place or to get the men inside of it to charge out of it by means of a feint retreat. Thus, the fortification would lose its prime advantage.
The wagon fort's effect on Czech history was lost, but the Czechs would continue to use the wagon forts in later conflicts. After the Hussite Wars, foreign powers such as the Hungarians and Poles who had confronted the destructive forces of Hussites, hired thousands of Czech mercenaries (such as into the Black Army of Hungary). At the Battle of Varna in 1444, it is said that 600 Bohemian handgunners (men armed with early shoulder arms) defended a wagon fortification. The Germans would also use wagons for fortification. They would use much cheaper materials than the Hussites, and they would have different wagons for the infantry and the artillery. The Russians also used a type of movable fortress, called a guliai-gorod in the 16th century.

Another use of this tactic would be very similar to the infantry squares used by Wellington at the Battle of Waterloo and the South African laager. The wagon forts would form into squares that would support each other. Whenever an enemy charged between two forts, marksmen from both of them would easily exploit the advantage and kill many of the enemy.

Variations

Laager 

The English word laager comes from the obsolete Afrikaans word lager (now laer), which comes from  the German word Lager ("camp" or "lair") and the Dutch leger which also gives English 'leaguer' ("military camp").. The word refers to the ancient defensive formation used by travelers throughout the world in dangerous situations in which they would draw wagons into a circle and place cattle and horses on the inside to protect them from raiders or nocturnal animals. Laagers were extensively used by the Voortrekkers of the Great Trek during the 1830s. The laager was put to the ultimate test on 16 December 1838, when an army of 10,000–15,000 Zulu Impis besieged and were defeated by approximately 460 Voortrekkers in the aptly named Battle of Blood River. In 19th century America, the same approach was used by pioneers who would "circle the wagons" in case of attack.

Leaguer was used in the British Army for temporary overnight camps made by armoured formations.

Tabor 

A tabor is a convoy or a camp formed by horse-drawn wagons. For example, nomadic Romani used to wander and camp in tabor formations.  Tabors supported the armies in Europe between the 13th and 20th centuries. Tabors usually followed the armies and carried all the necessary supplies and rear units, such as field kitchens, armourers or shoemakers.

The tactics were later copied by various armies of Central Europe, including the army of the Polish–Lithuanian Commonwealth. In the 16th and 17th centuries, these tactics were also mastered by the Cossacks, who used their tabors for the protection of marching troops as well.

Further reading

See also 
Gulyay-gorod, Russian pre-fabricated mobile wooden fortification

References

External links 

 
 
 

Fortifications by type
Medieval defences
Military technology
Tactical formations
Wagons
Warfare of the Middle Ages